The Royal Artillery Association is an association of serving and former soldiers (officers and other ranks) of the British Army's Royal Regiment of Artillery (or Royal Artillery).

In addition to a permanent staff based at the Royal Artillery Barracks at Larkhill, Wiltshire, the association operates branches as social clubs for members in their local areas, and provides advice and assistance to former soldiers in transitioning to civilian life. It also maintains The RA Charitable Fund to provide financial support to distressed soldiers and their dependents whether serving or retired.

The Regimental Controller/Comptroller of the Royal Regiment of Artillery is usually a Colonel Commandant appointed by the Master Gunner to act as Comptroller of the Royal Artillery Association and the Royal Artillery Charitable Fund (and as Controller of the Royal Artillery Institution). He is Chairman of the Board of Management of RAA and the RACF (and Chairman of the RAI Committee).

Branches

References

British veterans' organisations